James Bryan Foster (9 March 1854 – 22 November 1914) was an English cricketer. Foster was a right-handed batsman who bowled right-arm medium pace. He was born at Ramsgate, Kent. His name was also recorded as James Bryan Hone and James Bryan Hone-Foster.

Foster made two first-class appearances for Kent against Derbyshire in 1880 at Mote Park, Maidstone, and Yorkshire in 1881 at Park Avenue, Bradford. He scored a total of 10 runs at an average of 3.33, with a high score of 6.

He died at Stirchley, Warwickshire on 22 November 1914.

References

External links

1854 births
1914 deaths
People from Ramsgate
English cricketers
Kent cricketers